The 2018 Shanghai Greenland Shenhua season was Shanghai Greenland Shenhua's 15th season in the Chinese Super League and 56th overall in the Chinese top flight. In addition to the domestic league, the club also competed in the Chinese FA Cup, Chinese FA Super Cup and AFC Champions League.

Season events

Squad

First team squad

Remarks:
NA These players are not registered for the group stage of 2018 AFC Champions League but eligible to play at Chinese domestic football competitions.
SU These players are eligible to play at Chinese domestic football competitions after mid-season transfer window summer 2018.

Source：

Reserve squad

Remarks:
RE Registered for reserve squad after mid-season transfer window summer 2018.

Left club during season

Transfers and loans

Transfers in

Transfers out

Loans in

Loans out

Friendlies

Pre-season

Mid-season

Competitions

Chinese Super League

League table

Results summary

Results by round

Matches

Chinese FA Cup

Chinese FA Super Cup

AFC Champions League

Group stage

Squad statistics

Appearances and goals

|-
|colspan="14"|Players who away from the club on loan:

|-
|colspan="14"|Players who left Shanghai Greenland Shenhua during the season:

|}

Goal scorers

Disciplinary Record

Notes

References

External links
Official Website

Shanghai Shenhua F.C. seasons
Shanghai Greenland Shenhua F.C.